6 is a number, numeral, and glyph.

6 or six may also refer to:
 AD 6, the sixth year of the AD era
 6 BC, the sixth year before the AD era
 The month of June

Science
 Carbon, the element with atomic number 6
 6 Hebe, an asteroid

People
 Alphonse Six (1890–1914), Belgian football player
 Didier Six (born 1954), former French international footballer
 Franz Six (1909–1975), Nazi official
 Frederick N. Six (born 1929), Justice of the Kansas Supreme Court
 James Six (1731–1793), British scientist
 Jan Six (1616-1700), an important cultural figure in the Dutch Golden Age
 Robert Six (1907–1986), Chief Executive Officer of Continental Airlines between 1936 and 1981
 Regine Sixt, German businessperson
 Valérie Six (born 1963), French politician
 Perri 6 (an extremely rare surname), social scientist
 Six family, family of regents of Amsterdam, founded by Jan Six

Music 
 Six (band), an Irish pop band created by a TV reality show
 Six (musical), a musical about the six wives of King Henry VIII
 #6, the pseudonym of American musician Shawn Crahan, when performing with Slipknot

Albums 
 6 (After Crying album), 1997
 6 (Amir Tataloo album), 2015
 6 (Garmarna album), 2016
 6 (Hadag Nachash album), 2010
 6 (Mucc album), 2006
 6 (Pigface album), 2009
 6 (Soil & "Pimp" Sessions album), 2009
 6 (Supersilent album), 2003
 6 (The Ex album), 1991
 6, an album by Yuridia, 2015
 Six, album by Dream Evil, 2017
 Six (Loverboy album), 1997
 Six (Mansun album), 1998
 Six (Soft Machine album), 1973
 Six (The Black Heart Procession album), 2009
 Six (Tony Banks album)
 Six (Whodini album)

Songs 
 "Six" (song), a 1999 song by Mansun
 "Six", by All That Remains from their album The Fall of Ideals
 "Six", by Chimaira from their album Resurrection
 "6ix", by The Lemonheads from their album Car Button Cloth
 "Six", by the cast of the musical Six

Fiction 
 6 (film),  a 2013 Tamil crime thriller
 Six (film), a 2012 Telugu language suspense thriller
 Six, a breed of superhumans in Philip K. Dick's novel Flow My Tears, the Policeman Said
 Sixers, a splinter faction in the television series Terra Nova
 No. 6, a Japanese manga by Atsuko Asano
 Noble Six, a SPARTAN super-soldier from the game, Halo: Reach
Six (TV series), a History channel series about United States Navy SEALs

Fictional characters
 Number 6 (The Prisoner), the main character of The Prisoner
 Number Six (Battlestar Galactica), a character in the science fiction television series Battlestar Galactica
 Six, a witch woman in Terry Goodkind's novel Phantom
 Six, a character in the television series Blossom
 Six, a character in the television series Tripping the Rift
 Six, a character in the television series Generator Rex
 Six, the protagonist of the horror-adventure video game series Little Nightmares.

Transportation

Automobiles
 BMW 6 Series, a German mid-size luxury car series
 Mazda6, a Japanese mid-size car
 Mercedes-Maybach 6, a German concept grand tourer

Engines
 Straight-six engine
 V6 engine

Public transportation
 6 (New York City Subway service), a service of the New York City Subway

Other uses 
 No. 6 novel, manga and anime series
 No.6 Records
 SIX (Slovak Internet eXchange), a Slovak internet exchange point
 SIX, the stock market symbol for Six Flags
 Six, West Virginia, an unincorporated community in McDowell County
 Six Lake, a lake in Minnesota
 Six (cricket), a boundary shot in cricket
 SIX Swiss Exchange, Switzerland's principal stock exchange
 Six, the U.S. Army radio call sign of a company or battalion commander
 6 (BMT rapid transit service)
 6 (New York City Subway service)
 Sony SIX, a sports channel in India
 "Watch your six" or "on your six", references to "behind" (with "12" being "ahead") originally from aviation/clock-position terms

See also
 06 (disambiguation)
 6.0 (disambiguation)
 
 
 
 List of highways numbered 6
 Number Six (disambiguation)
 SIX (disambiguation)
 Year Six
 The Six (disambiguation)
 Sick (disambiguation) (including uses of Sicks)
 System 6, a release of Mac OS
 System 6 (word processor), a word processor from IBM